"It's Me That You Need" is a song by English musician Elton John with lyrics by Bernie Taupin.

Release and performances
It was his third single, released almost four months after "Lady Samantha". It has a light pop sense and was penned by critics to be a radio hit. However, it actually performed worse than his previous two singles and also failed to chart in the U.S. and the UK.

The song did become a hit in Japan two years later, peaking at the No. 13 on the country's Oricon sales chart, and No. 2 on the international chart. It had been the most commercially successful song for Elton in that country, until the double A-side single "Candle in the Wind 1997" / "Something About the Way You Look Tonight" topped the chart in October 1997.

John played a solo version live as the first song on his 1971 tour of Japan. It was heavily applauded, as it was his first single to be released there. Since then, it has not been played anywhere.

Composition

Musical structure
It opens with a string section accompanied by a Hohner Pianet electric piano. When the song begins, a somewhat distorted electric guitar plays with strings. Horns are also featured. These two features would be standard in later releases by John. The song ends with John playing solo for the last fifteen seconds.

Lyrical meaning
It is a plain love song. However, the words are a bit advanced and more cryptic for other love songs at the time of its release. It tells a story about a man who is convinced he is the right one for the woman he is adoring. The last verse could also indicate that it is a story of an ex-girlfriend;

"Watching, watching the swallows fly 
It all means the same 
Just like them 
You can fly home again 
But don't, no don't forget yesterday 
Pride is an ugly word girl 
And you still know my name"

Covers
As with many British songs at the time, it was covered elsewhere in Europe.

In Italy, it was covered by Maurizio Vandelli, who had translated the song into Italian. It was called "Era Lei" (literally meaning "That Was Her") and the lyrical meaning had been slightly altered. This version charted in Italy and became a big hit.

Personnel
Elton John – Hohner Pianet electric piano, vocals
Caleb Quaye – guitar
Clive Franks – bass
Roger Pope – drums
Cy Payne – orchestral arranger, conductor

Chart history

External links 
 Discogs link

1969 singles
Elton John songs
Songs with lyrics by Bernie Taupin
Songs with music by Elton John
1969 songs
DJM Records singles